The Tri-State Athletic Conference was a short-lived intercollegiate athletic conference that existed from 1988 to 1990. The league had members, as its name suggests, in three states: Iowa, Nebraska, and Kansas.

Football champions
 1988 – Northwestern (IA)
 1989 – Peru State
 1990 – Peru State

See also
 List of defunct college football conferences

References

 
College sports in Iowa
College sports in Nebraska
College sports in Kansas